Hatsingimari College, Hatsingimari, established in 1987, is a general degree college situated at Hatsingimari, in South Salmara district, Assam. This college is affiliated with the Gauhati University.

Campus

Departments

Science
Physics
Mathematics
Chemistry
Botany
Zoology

Arts
Assamese
English
History
Education
Economics
Philosophy
Political Science

References

External links

Universities and colleges in Assam
Colleges affiliated to Gauhati University
Educational institutions established in 1987
1987 establishments in Assam